The Notacanthiformes  are an order of deep-sea ray-finned fishes, consisting of the families Halosauridae and Notacanthidae (spiny eels).

The order is of relatively recent vintage; Fishes of the World (2006) lists it as the suborder Notacanthoidei of Albuliformes. The notacanthiforms are much more eel-like than the albuliforms; for instance, the caudal fin has disappeared.

They are elongated fish, although not as much so as the true eels. They typically feed on slow-moving or sessile animals, such as molluscs, echinoderms, and sea anemones. Like the true eels, they have a leptocephalus larva that floats in the surface waters before transforming into an adult. Unusually, the larva can often be larger than the adult.

References 

 
Deep sea fish
Ray-finned fish orders
Extant Late Cretaceous first appearances
Taxa named by Lev Berg